"If I Had My Way" is the second single from Canadian rock band Big Sugar's 1996 album, Hemi-Vision.

Charts

Weekly charts

Year-end charts

References

1996 singles
Big Sugar songs
1996 songs
A&M Records singles
Songs written by Gordie Johnson